Unbound Gravel, formerly known as the Dirty Kanza, is an event comprising gravel racing covering various distances held annually during the late spring in the Flint Hills region of the Great Plains around Emporia, Kansas, United States. The race's organizers refer to the  mile race as the "World's Premiere Gravel Grinder", and ranked as one of the top gravel bike races. Winners are awarded a belt buckle.

Course
Starting and ending in Emporia, the routes runs along rural roads in the Flint Hills of east-central Kansas.  In some years the temperature on the route has exceeded , while other years have seen rain or hail.  It is not uncommon for rain to turn some dirt roads into "mud roads".

There are checkpoints spaced about 50 miles apart for longer races, and riders must carry water and food, as well as fix their own tires and bikes.  If riders receive outside support at any location other than official checkpoints it will result in immediate disqualification.  Riders may assist other riders by any means and at any time.

Events
Originally, the event was started as a  mile race, but over the years additional lengths have been added to encourage more riders to give it a chance.  Though the name of the race distances are rounded off to nice numerical values, the actual distance of each race is slightly different.

The event consists of the following races:
 Unbound Gravel XL is a  race.  It was introduced in 2018.
 Unbound Gravel 200 is a  race. The original  Dirty Kanza ultra endurance gravel bicycling challenge was started in 2006.
 Unbound Gravel 100 is a  race. It was introduced in 2013.
 Unbound Gravel 50 is a  race. It was introduced in 2013.
 Unbound Gravel 25 is a  race. It was introduced in 2013.
 Unbound Gravel Junior is a  race for 7th to 12th grade teens.

History

In 2006, the first year of Dirty Kanza had 34 riders.

In 2018, Lift Time Fitness purchased Dirty Kanza Productions. That year the race had 2,500 registered riders.

In 2019, the race had 2,750 registered riders.

Several changes occurred in 2020.  First the races were postponed from May 29–31 to September 10–13 because of the ongoing worldwide COVID-19 pandemic issues, then later were cancelled.

Organizers considered a name change for the event to remove reference to Kaw nation (also known as Kanza) based on an online petition despite representatives of the Kaw Nation responding to the allegations, saying "Life Time and the Kaw Nation are proud of our relationship, which is built upon mutual respect, dignity, and integrity" and "It was felt that 'Kanza' paid homage to the region (the Kanza Prairie), to its rich history, and to all things associated with the region, including the Kaw Nation". 
The same year, the event's founder made a statement that the police shooting of an intoxicated black man in Atlanta who grabbed an officer's taser and fired it at the officer was "justified". The ensuing controversy resulted in his eventual firing by the event's parent company, Life Time Fitness. On October 29, 2020, it was announced that the name of the race would be changed to Unbound Gravel.

In 2021, the race had 2,626 registered riders.

Winners

Rebecca Rusch is notable for placing first female in six events across three distances: DK XL in 2018; DK 200 in 2012 / 2013 / 2014; DK 100 in 2016 and 2017.

Unbound Gravel XL
Before 2020, the race was known as the Dirty Kanza XL (or DK XL).  This 350 mile race was first held in 2018.  Results verified at Athlinks.

Unbound Gravel 200
Before 2020, the race was known as the Dirty Kanza 200 (or DK 200).  This 200 mile race was first held in 2006.  Results verified at Athlinks.

Unbound Gravel 100
Before 2020, the race was known as the DK 100.  This 100 mile race was first held in 2013 as the DK Half Pint. It became an official race distance in 2019.  Results verified at Athlinks.

See also
 Ultra-distance cycling
 Leadville Trail 100 MTB, a mountain bike race in Leadville, Colorado

References

External links

 Official race website
 2018 DK200 race footage (example of race and road conditions)
 Highway maps: Emporia city map, Lyon County map (includes Emporia), Kansas map.

Sports competitions in Kansas
Cycle races in the United States
Cycling events in the United States
Ultra-distance cycling
Recurring sporting events established in 2006
2006 establishments in Kansas
Gravel cycling